Darren Cyril Van Impe (born May 18, 1973) is a Canadian former ice hockey defenceman. He played in the National Hockey League for the Mighty Ducks of Anaheim, Boston Bruins, New York Rangers, Florida Panthers, New York Islanders, Columbus Blue Jackets between 1995 and 2003.

Playing career
Van Impe was drafted 170th overall by the New York Islanders in the 1993 NHL Entry Draft and started his National Hockey League career with the Mighty Ducks of Anaheim in 1995.  He also played for the Boston Bruins, New York Rangers, Florida Panthers, New York Islanders, and Columbus Blue Jackets.  In total, Van Impe played 411 regular season games, scoring 25 goals and 90 assists for 115 points, collecting 397 penalty minutes.  He also played 33 playoff games, scoring 3 goals and 9 assists for 12 points and collecting 28 penalty minutes. He scored his first NHL goal on Easter Sunday 4/7/1996 at San Jose in a 5-3 Anaheim win.  He left the NHL after the 2003 season and moved to Germany to play in the Deutsche Eishockey Liga.  He first played for the Hamburg Freezers between 2003 and 2006 before moving to the DEG Metro Stars before retiring in 2008.

Career statistics

Regular season and playoffs

Awards
 WHL East First All-Star Team – 1993 & 1994

External links

1973 births
Living people
Baltimore Bandits players
Boston Bruins players
Canadian expatriate ice hockey players in Germany
Canadian ice hockey defencemen
Columbus Blue Jackets players
DEG Metro Stars players
Florida Panthers players
Hamburg Freezers players
Ice hockey people from Saskatchewan
Mighty Ducks of Anaheim players
New York Islanders draft picks
New York Islanders players
New York Rangers players
Prince Albert Raiders players
Red Deer Rebels players
San Diego Gulls (IHL) players
Sportspeople from Saskatoon
Syracuse Crunch players